Robert W. Evans (May 31, 1925 – September 27, 1997) was an American professional basketball player. Evans was selected in the fourth round of the 1949 BAA Draft by the Indianapolis Olympians after a collegiate career at Butler. He played for one season in the National Basketball Association and averaged 3.0 points and 1.2 assists per game.

References

1925 births
1997 deaths
American men's basketball players
Basketball players from Indianapolis
Butler Bulldogs men's basketball players
Guards (basketball)
Indianapolis Olympians draft picks
Indianapolis Olympians players